WFPL (89.3 MHz) is a 24-hour listener-supported, noncommercial FM radio station in Louisville, Kentucky. The station focuses on news and information, and is the primary National Public Radio network affiliate for the Louisville radio market. WFPL is now owned by Louisville Public Media and was originally owned by the Louisville Free Public Library. When the station came on the air in 1950, it was the first library-owned radio station in the country.

WFPL's transmitter is off Moser Knob Road in New Albany, Indiana, amid the towers for other Louisville-area FM and TV stations.  The 21,000 watt signal covers parts of Kentucky and Indiana.

History

On February 20, 1950, WFPL first signed on the air.  It began operating as a public radio station under the ownership of the Louisville Free Public Library, giving the station the distinction of being the first library-owned radio station in the country. Founded years before the Public Broadcasting Act of 1967 and National Public Radio's creation in 1970, the station was made possible by the donation of equipment by the Bingham family, who owned The Courier-Journal and WHAS 840 AM radio at the time.

In 1993, the library joined with the University of Louisville to form the Public Radio Partnership (now Louisville Public Media) to operate WFPL and the city's other public radio stations, WFPK and WUOL-FM. Since then, WFPL has steered away from music to focus on broadcasting news and informational programming. Like its sister stations, WFPL broadcasts an HD radio signal.

Awards
In 1951 WFPL won a George Foster Peabody award for public service.

See also
 WFPK
 WUOL-FM

References

External links
WFPL web site

FPL
NPR member stations
Radio stations established in 1950
1950 establishments in Kentucky